Football Club Inhulets Petrove is a professional Ukrainian football club from the town of Petrove, Kirovohrad Oblast that competes in the Ukrainian Premier League following the promotion from 2019–20 Ukrainian First League. The club colours are yellow and red.

History
The club was founded in the spring of 2013 under the name FC Ahrofirma Pyatykhatska Volodymyrivka because the team sponsorship was one of the largest agricultural enterprises of Kirovohrad region. The president of the club was also the enterprise's president – Oleksandr Povorozniuk who previously was a president of FC Desna Chernihiv. In their first season Ahrofirma Piatykhatska was runner up in the Kirovohrad Oblast Cup. In 2013–2014, the club competed in both Kirovohrad Oblast and Dnipropetrovsk Oblast regional football competitions.

Club President Oleksandr Povorozniuk initiated a children's football teams in every village of the Petrove Raion.

The club in 2014 competed in the Ukrainian Football Amateur League and were beaten finalists in the championship game.

In February 2015, the club was renamed to Inhulets. The club again competed in the 2015 Amateur Championship but during the season the club entered the professional ranks and joined the PFL entering into the Ukrainian Second League. Inhulets Petrove continued its participation among amateurs with its second team, FC Inhulets-2 Petrove.

In their first season, the club were promoted to the Ukrainian First League.

In 2015 Inhulets competed at the 2015 UEFA Regions' Cup as "AF Pyatykhatska" representing Ukraine.

In 2019, the club reached one of its greatest achievements, arriving at the final of its national cup. The game ended with a 4-0 defeat by Shakhtar Donetsk.

At the end of the 2019-20 season, Inhulets was promoted to the Ukrainian Premier League for the first time in their history.

Images

Honours and distinctions

Domestic competitions
Ukrainian Cup
Runners–up (1): 2018–19
Ukrainian Amateur Football Championship
Runners–up (1): 2014
Ukrainian Amateur Cup 
 Winners (1): 2014
Kirovohrad Oblast Championship
Winners (1): 2014
Runners–up (1): 2013

Individual Player & Coach awards
Best Player of Ukrainian First League
 Nika Sichinava 2019–20

League and cup history

{|class="wikitable"
|-bgcolor="#efefef"
! Season
! Div.
! Pos.
! Pl.
! W
! D
! L
! GS
! GA
! P
!Domestic Cup
!colspan=2|Other
!Notes
|-
|align=center colspan=14|AF Piatykhatska Volodymyrivka
|-bgcolor=SteelBlue
|align=center rowspan=2|2014
|align=center rowspan=2|4th
|align=center|1
|align=center|6
|align=center|4
|align=center|1
|align=center|1
|align=center|27
|align=center|8
|align=center|13
|align=center rowspan=2 bgcolor=gold|Amateur CupWinners
|align=center rowspan=2|
|align=center rowspan=2|
|align=center|
|-bgcolor=SteelBlue
|align=center|1
|align=center|3
|align=center|2
|align=center|1
|align=center|0
|align=center|5
|align=center|2
|align=center|7
|align=center bgcolor=silver|Runners up
|-
|align=center colspan=14|Inhulets Petrove
|-bgcolor=SteelBlue
|align=center rowspan=2|2015
|align=center rowspan=2|4th
|align=center|1
|align=center|6
|align=center|4
|align=center|0
|align=center|2
|align=center|9
|align=center|4
|align=center|12
|align=center rowspan=2|
|align=center rowspan=2|RC
|align=center rowspan=2|Group stage
|align=center|
|-bgcolor=SteelBlue
|align=center|2
|align=center|10
|align=center|6
|align=center|0
|align=center|4
|align=center|16
|align=center|8
|align=center|18
|align=center bgcolor=lightgreen|
|-bgcolor=PowderBlue
|align=center|2015–16
|align=center|3rd
|align=center bgcolor=tan|3/14
|align=center|26 	
|align=center|14 	
|align=center|8 	
|align=center|4 	
|align=center|37 	
|align=center|16 	
|align=center|50
|align=center| finals
|align=center|
|align=center|
|align=center bgcolor=lightgreen|Promoted
|-bgcolor=LightCyan
|align=center|2016–17
|align=center rowspan=4|2nd
|align=center|13/18
|align=center|34 	
|align=center|10 	
|align=center|8 		
|align=center|16 	
|align=center|33 	
|align=center|45 		 	
|align=center|38
|align=center| finals
|align=center|
|align=center|
|align=center|
|-bgcolor=LightCyan
|align=center|2017–18
|align=center|4/18
|align=center|34 	
|align=center|21  
|align=center|6  
|align=center|7  
|align=center|46
|align=center|20     	
|align=center|69
|align=center| finals
|align=center|
|align=center|
|align=center|
|-bgcolor=LightCyan
|align=center|2018–19
|align=center|7/15
|align=center|28
|align=center|11
|align=center|9
|align=center|8
|align=center|35
|align=center|32   	
|align=center|42
|align=center bgcolor=silver|Final
|align=center|
|align=center|
|align=center|
|-bgcolor=LightCyan
|align=center|2019–20
|align=center bgcolor=tan|3/16
|align=center|30
|align=center|17
|align=center|9
|align=center|4
|align=center|47
|align=center|22
|align=center|60
|align=center| finals
|align=center|
|align=center|
|align=center bgcolor=lightgreen|Promoted
|-bgcolor=White
|align=center|2020–21
|align=center rowspan=1|1st
|align=center|12/14
|align=center|26  
|align=center|5 
|align=center|11 
|align=center|10  
|align=center|24 
|align=center|	39  
|align=center|26 
|align=center| finals
|align=center|
|align=center|
|align=center|
|}

Notes:

Players

Current squad

Other players under contract

Out on loan

Europe competitions

In 2015, "Inhulets" competed at the 2015 UEFA Regions' Cup as "AF Pyatykhatska" representing Ukraine. Entering the competition at the intermediate group stage (total 3 stages) and playing in Moldova, the team was not able to qualify for final tournament in the Republic of Ireland.

For the 2017 UEFA Regions' Cup where Ukraine was represented by a team of Kirovohrad Oblast (Kirovograd Region according to the UEFA), which was composed out of the Inhulets' reserve team, UEFA admitted the team under the name of "Ingulee, Kirovograd Region". Entering the competition again at the intermediate group stage which was played in Malta, the team was able to qualify for the final tournament in Turkey.

List of managers
 2013 Valeriy Len
 2013–2015 Ruslan Pereverziy
 2015 Viktor Bohatyr
 2015–2016 Eduard Khavrov
 2016 Dmytro Kolodyn
 2016–2022 Serhiy Lavrynenko
 2022 Mladen Bartulović (interim)
 2022– Serhiy Kovalets

Administrative and coaching staff

See also
 FC Inhulets-2 Petrove

References

External links
 Official website
 Inhulets Petrove at the Professional Football League of Ukraine

Media
Telegram
Facebook
Youtube
Instagram

 
Ukrainian Premier League clubs
Football clubs in Kirovohrad Oblast
Association football clubs established in 2013
2013 establishments in Ukraine